At least six monkey species are native to Panama.  A seventh species, the Coiba Island howler (Alouatta coibensis) is often recognized, but some authors treat it as a subspecies of the mantled howler, (A. palliata).  An eighth species, the black-headed spider monkey is also often recognized, but some authorities regard it as a subspecies of Geoffroy's spider monkey.  All Panamanian monkey species are classified taxonomically as New World monkeys, and they belong to four families.  The Coiba Island howler, mantled howler, black-headed spider monkey and Geoffroy's spider monkey all belong to the family Atelidae.  The white-faced capuchins and Central American squirrel monkey belong to the family Cebidae. the family that includes the capuchin monkeys and squirrel monkeys.   The Panamanian night monkey belongs to the family Aotidae, and Geoffroy's tamarin belongs to the family Callitrichidae.

The mantled howler, the Panamanian night monkey, Geoffroy's spider monkey and the Panamanian white-faced capuchin all have extensive ranges within Panama.  Geoffroy's tamarin also has a fairly wide range within Panama, from west of the Panama Canal to the Colombian border.  The range of the black-headed spider monkey and Colombian white-faced capuchin within Panama are limited to the eastern portion of the country near the Colombian border.  The Central American squirrel monkey only occurs within Panama in the extreme western portion of the country, near Costa Rica.  It now has a smaller range within Panama than in the past, and is no longer found in its type locality, the city of David.  As its name suggests, the Coiba Island howler is restricted to Coiba Island.  The Azuero howler monkey (Alouatta coibensis trabeata or Alouatta palliata trabeata), which is considered a subspecies of either the Coiba Island howler or the mantled howler, is restricted to the Azuero Peninsula.

Geoffroy's spider monkey is the next largest, followed by the howler monkey species.

One Panamanian monkey, the black-headed spider monkey, is considered to be critically endangered by the International Union for Conservation of Nature (IUCN), and Geoffroy's spider monkey is considered to be endangered.  The Central American squirrel monkey was once considered endangered, but its conservation status was upgraded to vulnerable in 2008.  The Coiba Island howler is also considered to be vulnerable.  Three species, the mantled howler, the white-faeced capuchin and Geoffroy's tamarin are rated as "least concern" from a conservation standpoint.

Key

Panamanian monkey species

Footnotes
Sometimes regarded as a subspecies of Alouatta palliata.  Sizes given are for Alouatta palliata.
Sometimes regarded as a subspecies of Aotus lemurinus, in which case its trinomial name is Aotus lemurinis zonalis.
Sometimes regarded as a subspecies of Ateles geoffroyi.
Formerly regarded to be conspecific with Cebus imitator.  Sizes given are for Cebus imitator.

References

Panama
 Panama
Monkeys
New World monkeys
Panamanian monkey species